Abd-ol Seyyed or Abd ol Seyyed or Abdol Seyyed may refer to:
 Abd-ol Seyyed, Ahvaz
 Abd-ol Seyyed, Shushtar